The following is a list of islands of Arizona.  With  of land, the state of Arizona is the sixth-largest in the United States.  It is the third-largest state to not have an ocean coastline—after Montana and New Mexico.  Despite being landlocked, Arizona does contain islands, even though the state has the third-lowest amount of water at only  after West Virginia and New Mexico.  Arizona's 0.32% of water is the second-lowest percentage after New Mexico's 0.2% of water.  The majority of Arizona's islands are in the Colorado River (mainly Lake Mead). Lake Roosevelt also contains a number of islands.

References

External links
Arizona Place Names

Arizona
Islands